Puze parish is an administrative unit of the Ventspils Municipality, Latvia.The parish has a population of 1021 (as of 1/07/2010) and covers an area of 207.28 km2.

Villages of Puze parish 
 Amele
 Dandzītes
 Līcnieki
 Nīcciems
 Nīcnieki
 Puze (Blāzma)
 Puzenieki
 Puzesmuiža
 Stikli
 Trebējciems

Parishes of Latvia
Ventspils Municipality